The ZUK Z1 is an Android smartphone manufactured by ZUK Mobile, in collaboration with Lenovo. Unveiled in August 2015, it is the first product by ZUK. In most markets outside China, the ZUK Z1 ships with the Cyanogen OS operating system pre-installed. Cyanogen OS is a commercial variant of CyanogenMod. The device was released with Cyanogen OS 12.1, based on Android 5.1 "Lollipop", and was never updated to Cyanogen OS 13, based on Android 6.0 "Marshmallow". In China, the ZUK Z1 ships with its own ZUI distribution, based on Android 5.1 "Lollipop".

In India the phone was launched at a price of Rs.13,999 on amazon. However the updates for this phone were limited and soon the company stopped giving updates.

This phone as earlier described had Cyanogen OS operating system but later the company Cyanogen OS was closed and it was replaced by Lineage OS.

See also 
 OnePlus One
 Lenovo smartphones

References

External links 
 Zuk Official
 Lemo International partner
 Zuk Mobile Canada
 Zuk Official Distributor

Android (operating system) games
Mobile phones introduced in 2015
Mobile phones with 4K video recording